Ulla Winblad was a semi-fictional character in many of Carl Michael Bellman's musical works. She is at once an idealised rococo goddess and a tavern prostitute, and a key figure in Bellman's songs of Fredman's Epistles. The character was partly inspired by Maria Kristina Kiellström (1744–1798).

A dual character 

Edvard Matz, author of a book about Carl Michael Bellman's women, calls Ulla "one of the really great female figures in Swedish literature". 
Bellman's English biographer, Paul Britten Austin, summarizes Ulla's dual nature: 
 "Ulla is at once a nymph of the taverns and a goddess of a rococo universe of graceful and hot imaginings".

Fredman's Epistles are distinctive in combining realism - drink, poverty, gambling, prostitution, old age - with elegant mythological rococo flourishes, enabling Bellman to achieve both comic and elegiac effects. Britten Austin cites Afzelius:

The sluttiest of the barmaids "on the rosiest mythological clouds" is of course Ulla. In Epistle 36 Vår Ulla låg i sängen och sov, (Our Ulla lay in bed and slept), Bellman "at his most rococo" describes Ulla asleep in a tavern bedroom - while the owner peeps through the keyhole and three excited drunks wait outside. As she wakes, three rococo cupids assist her with make-up, perfume, and her hair. Then she runs into the bar, revives herself with a glass of brandy, and leaves with the blindest of the waiting fellows, "leaving the inmates of the tavern, shaken, to contemplate Ulla's glass where she has left it, empty and broken on the bar."

Ulla and the real Maria Kristina Kiellström 

The fictional Ulla Winblad and the real Maria Kristina Kiellström have frequently been confused, but were not at all the same. Kiellström, born in 1744 in a poor family, did borrow her stepmother's surname, Winblad (the name means vine-leaf). About 1763, she found a job in a silk factory. At the age of about twenty Kiellström became notorious for being made pregnant by a Swedish nobleman, Count Wilhelm Schildt. And in 1767, while without regular employment, she was accused of wearing a red silk cape, a banned luxury item: but unlike Ulla, she was acquitted. By 1770, Kiellström had moved out of the town centre; she and another girl, whose name was Ulla, were both officially recorded as being suspected by their landlord of "loose living".

Bellman met Kiellström in about 1769. Soon afterwards, he sang of Ulla Winblad for the first time in Fredman's Epistle number 25, Blåsen nu alla, subtitled Which is an attempt at a pastoral in Bacchanalian taste, written on Ulla Winblad's crossing to Djurgården. It begins with rococo "angels, dolphins, zephyrs and the whole might of Paphos (compare the illustration of Boucher's Birth of Venus) and musical flourishes on the horn ("Corno") and ends with Ulla as "my nymph" and the sentiment "May love come into our lives".

Bellman worked up the silk cape incident into the beautiful rococo Epistle 28, where Fredman sees a "goddess", elegantly dressed, with illegally flounced and frilled petticoats.

Kiellström married a customs officer, Eric Nordström, in 1772: Bellman found him his job. The couple lived very close to Bellman, and Norström too appears in the Epistles; a "quarrelsome violent man" and a drinker, he died in a police cell. Kiellström was still attractive enough to remarry at the age of 42; her second husband, 11 years younger than her, complained that she was "generally and in printed songs known for passionate living."

The mythic Ulla 

The Ulla Winblad depicted in Fredman's Epistles is at once romanticised and clearly sexual. Epistle 71, in Britten Austin's words "the apogee, perhaps, of all that is typically bellmansk" evokes the Swedish countryside at Djurgården in summertime, as Bellman imagines riding out of town and finding Ulla at her window. The song is called a Pastorale, and titled "To Ulla at her window, Fisherman's Cottage, lunchtime, one summer's day". It begins

Ulla, min Ulla, säj, får jag dig bjuda
rödaste smultron i mjölk och vin,...Ulla, my Ulla, say may I offer you
reddest strawberries in milk and wine...

 See also 

 Österlånggatan
 Ulla von Höpken

 References 

 Bibliography 

 Paul Britten Austin. The Life and Songs of Carl Michael Bellman: Genius of the Swedish Rococo. Allhem, Malmö American-Scandinavian Foundation, New York, 1967. 
 Paul Britten Austin. Fredman's Epistles and Songs, (Stockholm: Proprius, 1999).
 Carl Michael Bellman. Fredmans Epistlar (Epistles of Fredman). 1790.
 
  (with facsimiles of sheet music from first editions in 1790, 1791)
 
 Hendrik Willem van Loon and Grace Castagnetta. The Last of the Troubadours, (New York: Simon and Schuster, 1939).
 Michael Roberts. Epistles and Songs, (Grahamstown, three volumes, 1977–1981).
 Charles Wharton Stork. Anthology of Swedish Lyrics from 1750 to 1915'', (New York: The American-Scandinavian Foundation, 1917).

External links 
 Bellman.net on Ulla Winblad and Maija-Stina Kiellström (In Swedish)
 Carl Michael Bellman at Swedish Wikisource

Female characters in literature
Literary characters introduced in 1790
Fictional characters based on real people
Fictional Swedish people
Fictional courtesans
Carl Michael Bellman